Gary Kowalski (born July 2, 1960) is a former professional American football player who played offensive lineman for six seasons for the Los Angeles Rams and San Diego Chargers.

Gary Kowalski played college football at Boston College and was drafted by the Los Angeles Rams in the sixth round of the 1983 NFL Draft. He was then traded to San Diego Chargers as a left tackle in 1985. Kowalski has played in 58 games and started in 28. As of 2019 he currently resides where he grew up in Deep River, Connecticut.

References

1960 births
American football offensive linemen
Los Angeles Rams players
San Diego Chargers players
Boston College Eagles football players
Living people